Andrey Alekseyevich Nechayev (born February 2, 1953, Moscow) is a Russian politician, scientist and economist. He is best known for being the first Minister of Economic Development of new Russia, from 1992-1993 (Viktor Chernomyrdin's First Cabinet). Nechayev is one of the authors and active participants in the program of market-oriented economic reforms in Russia.

Biography
Nechayev is a Doctor of Economics, Professor (2002), author of 25 books (including co-authored), and almost 300 scientific publications on economic developments and policies. Professor of Plekhanov Russian University of Economics.

Nechayev is chairman of the party Civic Initiative.

He was the president of the state owned Russian Financial Corporation (RFK) from 1993 until 2005 when it was privatized and he continued as president of Bank "Russian Financial Corporation" or RFK-Bank from 2005 to 2013.

Since 2013, he has been a lobbyist for Rusconsult. Through his and his daughter's ownership of Rusconsult which owns the controlling stake in RFK-Bank, he has been a pivotal lobbyist for state and government contracts, which must have accounts with RFK-Bank or its subsidiaries, including contracts with the Gazprom subsidiaries Gazprom-UGS and Tsentrenergogaz or Centerenergogaz.

Personal life
Andrey Nechayev is the father of Ksenia Nechayevna, who is married to Nikolai Vitalyevich Tkachenko of Gazprom

Notes

References

External links 

 Biography
 

1953 births
Living people
Economists from Moscow
Economy ministers of Russia
Moscow State University alumni
Union of Right Forces politicians
Russian activists against the 2022 Russian invasion of Ukraine
Russian liberals
Academic staff of the Plekhanov Russian University of Economics